Jeong Du-yeong ( born December 31, 1968) is a South Korean serial killer who killed 9 people from June 1999 to April 2000.

In 1986, when he was 18 years old, he was sentenced to 11 years in prison for killing 43-year-old officer Kim Chan-il. After his release, he was again arrested for theft and sentenced to six months in prison. In the following 10 months, he committed 16 robberies, killing 9 people in Busan, Ulsan, Gyeongnam and Chungham.

Life 
Jeong Du-yeong was born in 1968 as the youngest child with three brothers and one sister. His father died when he was two and his mother remarried, leaving Jeong to be cared for by his uncle. He had a serious complex due to his appearance, and said that the reason for the 1986 murder was simply because he thought the officer ignored him. Jeong, who spent most of his childhood in an orphanage, stated in his post-arrest statement that he wanted to have an ordinary family. Until then, money was not collected by theft and robbery, but by a bankbook, reaching a total amount of 130 million won. He said that he had planned to arrange marriages to a total of one billion people, and that he was going to build an apartment and PC room.

On September 28, 2016, while imprisoned in Daejeon Prison, he was caught trying to escape using a ladder that he had secretly built while working in the workshop. He escaped over two of three prison walls, but failed to cross the last wall.

Jeong Du-yeong's brother-in-law was an accomplice. His brother was not aware of that Jeong murdered people.

Crimes 
 On June 2, 1999, Lee Young-ja, a housekeeper who lived alone in a wealthy residential area in Busan, died after having parts of her face brutally pierced. At the time, the fact that the victim's house was next door to the inspection office of the Busan High Public Prosecutors' Office was a topic of discussion, but it turned out to be a coincidence.
 On September 15, 1999, while stealing money from the high-end villas of Seo-gu in Busan, Jeong cruelly killed the housemaid.
 On October 21, 1999, a 53-year-old mother and her 24-year-old son were killed in a luxury housing complex in Ulsan. In this case, the police paid attention to the 'overdrive' which was not seen in the other robberies, but no connection was established to the previous events in Busan.
 On March 11, 2000, a couple of women were attacked in a high-end residence in Seo-gu by a man with a baseball bat. One of the women said that she had a baby, and the killer let her live. Based on the survivor's statement, the police described the attacker as tall and in his 20s or 30s, sending this to the national police.
 On April 8, 2000, in Dongbu-ku, Busan, Jeong killed 76-year-old Chung Jin-tae and his housekeeper with a knife, also hitting Chung's grandmother. He stole a check worth 24.3 million won. While the grandmother was passing the emergency service in the hospital, she came by a police officer dispatched to the hospital and then saw Jeong Du-yeong, who was caught in Cheonan, pointing out that he was responsible for the murders. Jeong subsequently confessed to his crimes.

Trial

First trial 
On July 21, 2000, the Busan District Court sentenced Jeong Du-yeong, who was charged with robbery, to death, and also sentenced his brother-in-law, Kim Jong-young, to one year and six months imprisonment. The defendants objected and submitted an appeal to the Busan District Court.

Second trial 
On November 30, 2000, the Busan Appellate Court dismissed all the appeals and maintained Jeong's death sentence and Kim's one year and six months sentence. Jeong abandoned his appeals towards the Supreme Court, confirming his death penalty. He is now serving his sentence in Daejeon prison.

See also 
 Yoo Young-chul
 Kang Ho-sun
 List of serial killers by country

References 

1968 births
Jeong clans
Male serial killers
Living people
Prisoners sentenced to death by South Korea
South Korean people convicted of murder
South Korean serial killers